Financial Advisor is a monthly financial services magazine which delivers market information for financial advisors.

Overview
The magazine was launched in 2000 and it is headquartered in Shrewsbury, New Jersey. Its articles focus on strategies and management advice for advisors of affluent clients. Its targeted readership includes financial planners, investment advisors, and broker-dealers.

Financial Advisor is published by Charter Financial Publishing Network, Shrewsbury, New Jersey and has a circulation of 110,000 copies.

References

External links
Official Website
Cryptocurrency Guide

2000 establishments in New Jersey
Business magazines published in the United States
Monthly magazines published in the United States
News magazines published in the United States
Magazines established in 2000
Magazines published in New Jersey